Marmoricola aurantiacus is a Gram-positive and aerobic bacterium from the genus Marmoricola which has been isolated from a marble statue in Germany.

References

External links 
Type strain of Marmoricola aurantiacus at BacDive -  the Bacterial Diversity Metadatabase

Propionibacteriales
Bacteria described in 2000